Ivor Robinson may refer to:

 Ivor Robinson (craftsman) (1924–2014), British master craftsman and bookbinder
 Ivor Robinson (physicist) (1923-2016), American mathematical physicist